The Jewish Star may refer to:

The Jewish Star (Alberta), a former newspaper in Alberta
The Jewish Star (New York), a free weekly newspaper that covers the Orthodox Jewish communities in Nassau County, New York and New York City

See also
Star of David, sometimes known as the "Jewish Star"